Brian Hamilton may refer to:

 Brian Hamilton (actor) (born 1964), American actor
 Brian Hamilton (fencer) (born 1937), Irish Olympic fencer
 Brian Hamilton (footballer) (born 1967), Scottish footballer
 Brian Hamilton (businessman), American entrepreneur and philanthropist
 Brian Hamilton, a short-lived character on The Young and the Restless

See also
 Bryan Hamilton (born 1946), Northern Irish footballer
 Bryan Willis Hamilton (born 1983), American music producer and composer